Easop Winston Jr. (born December 17, 1996) is an American football wide receiver for the Seattle Seahawks of the National Football League (NFL). He played college football at Washington State.

Early life
Easop Winston Jr. was born on December 17, 1996, to Easop Winston Sr. and Renee Winston. He grew up In South San Francisco, California and attended Junípero Serra High School in San Mateo, California, where he played football, basketball, and ran track and field. His senior year, the Padres would be named co-champions of the WCAL with Archbishop Mitty Monarchs and would go on to defeat the Monarchs in the CCS Championship Final to win their first Sectional Open Division Championship in any sport and at any level. He was teammates in football and basketball with NFL player Matt Dickerson.

College career
Winston began his collegiate career at the City College of San Francisco. He grayshirted his first year after enrolling and had 62 receptions for 986 yards and 12 touchdowns the following season. As a sophomore, Winston caught 71 passes for 1,171 yards and 12 touchdowns. Winston committed to play at Washington State for his remaining eligibility over an offer from Eastern Michigan.

Winston redshirted his first season with the Washington State Cougars. As a redshirt junior, he played the "Z" receiver position and had 52 receptions for 654 yards and eight touchdowns. Winston caught 85 passes for 970 yards with 11 touchdowns as a redshirt senior.

Professional career

Los Angeles Rams
Winston signed with the Los Angeles Rams as an undrafted free agent on April 25, 2020. He was waived by the Rams during final roster cuts on September 4, 2020.

New Orleans Saints
Winston was signed by the New Orleans Saints on May 6, 2021. He was waived on August 31, 2021, during final roster cuts and was re-signed to the practice squad the next day. Winston was elevated to the active roster on December 12, 2021, for the team's Week 14 game against the New York Jets. He signed a reserve/future contract with the Saints on January 11, 2022. He was waived on August 15, 2022.

Cleveland Browns 
WInston was claimed off waivers by the Cleveland Browns on August 16, 2022. He was waived by the Browns on August 30, 2022.

Seattle Seahawks 
On October 19, 2022, Winston was signed to the Seattle Seahawks practice squad. He signed a reserve/future contract on January 17, 2023.

References

External links
Washington State Cougars bio
New Orleans Saints bio

1996 births
Living people
People from South San Francisco, California
Players of American football from San Francisco
American football wide receivers
Washington State Cougars football players
Los Angeles Rams players
New Orleans Saints players
City College of San Francisco Rams football players
Cleveland Browns players
Seattle Seahawks players